The Uwaisī (or Owaisi), Silsila (chain of transmission) or Tariqa (pathway) is a form of spiritual transmission in the vocabulary of Islamic mysticism, named after Owais al-Qarani. It refers to the transmission of spiritual knowledge between two individuals without the need for direct interaction between them. The term Uwaisīyaan refers to those Sufis who have gained the Sufi spiritual chain from another Sufi without physically meeting them in this world. It can refer to a school of Sufism, and its singular form, Uwaisi, refers an individual who is a Sunni Muslim.

Background

In the science of spirituality of Islam (Tasawwuf) the Uwaisi Transmission occurs when the spirits of righteous believers (saliheen, awliya) meet in the world called `alam al-arwaah (the world of spirits) which is beyond `alam al-ajsam (the material plane). Whoever takes knowledge through spirituality from a master in `alam al-arwaah  is called "Uwaisi". This means of transmission is considered as powerful and effective as the physical relation of master and disciple.

The term "Uwaisi" is derived from the name of Owais al-Qarani, who never met the Islamic prophet Muhammad in person, yet was fully aware of his spiritual presence at all points in his life.

In Classical Islam and the Naqshbandi Sufi Tradition, by Hisham Kabbani, it is noted that:

Contemporary Western orders
Silsila Owaisi is an active Uwaisi Sufi order from the United Kingdom led by Shaykh Banaras Owaisi. They operate a charity and offer spiritual healing services.

The "Uwaysi Order, a Shi'i branch of the Kubrawiya, was brought to the West by its shaykh, Shah Maghsoud Angha." There are two recent and distinct contemporary branches of the Uwaisi Order in the West following lengthy legal disputes between Shah Maghsoud's offspring.

One is Maktab Tarighat Oveyssi Shahmaghsoudi, headed by Nader Angha, the son of Shah Maghsoud. The other is the Uwaiysi Tarighat, led by Shah Maghsoud's daughter, Nahid Angha and her husband, Ali Kianfar. The couple co-founded the International Association of Sufism.

Muhammadia Uwaisia Order
Muhamadia Uwaisia Order is blessed to Shaykh Muhammad Owais Naqibi Qadri Suharwardi AbuAlAlai Naqshbandi, Chishti Sabri Jahangiri.

Shaykh Muhammad Owais was granted permission of Uwaisia silsila directly from Muhammad in his court in Madinah in 1st Shaban 1434 AH (2013 CE) and Muhammad blessed this silsila with the name "Mohammadia Uwaisia" (or "Muhammadia Uwaisia" or "Muhammadiya Uwaisia" or "Muhammdiya Owaisia").

Last shaykh  of silsla Uwaisa was Nūr ad-Dīn 'Abd ar-Rahmān Jāmī (Persian: نورالدین عبدالرحمن جامی‎) (1414-1492 CE).

People named Uwaisi
'Uwaisi' is also a name for people who claim to have been initiated through the Uwaisi method, or for those who claim to be descendants of Owais al-Qarani. Among the most famous is the Owaisi family of Hyderabad, India, one of the most prominent political and Sufi Muslim families of the city, including:  
 Shaykh Banaras Owaisi 
 Khaja Syed Muhammed Hashmi Owaisi Qibla
 Khaja Syed Anwar Hashmi Owaisi Qibla
 Khaja Syed Owais Hashmi Owaisi Qibla
 Khaja Syed Ather Hashmi Owaisi 
 Khaja Syed Akhter Hashmi Owaisi
 Sultan Salahuddin Owaisi
 Asaduddin Owaisi
 Akbaruddin Owaisi

See also
 International Association of Sufism
 Naqshbandia Owaisia
 Owais al-Qarani

References

External links
 International Association of Sufism
 MTO Shahmaghsoudi - School of Islamic Sufism
 Uwaiysi Tarighat
 Silsila Owaisi
 Medina Ghosia Owaisi Silsila UK
 The Uwaisi Transmission of Spiritual Knowledge, Naqshbandi-Haqqani website

Sufi orders
Sufism